Chloris elata is a species of grass known by the common name tall windmill grass.

It is native to: 
North America, in the U.S. state of Florida (within southern Florida)
Islands of the Caribbean, on Antigua and Barbuda (Antigua), Cuba, Hispaniola 
Central America in Honduras
South America, in Brazil, Guyana, Suriname, Venezuela, Bolivia, Peru, Argentina, Paraguay, and Uruguay

References

External links
 Herbarium.usu.edu:  Online Grass Manual treatment of Chloris elata (tall windmill grass)
 USDA Plants Profile for Chloris elata (tall windmill grass)

elata
Grasses of North America
Grasses of South America
Flora of the Caribbean
Grasses of Argentina
Grasses of Brazil
Grasses of Haiti
Grasses of the United States
Flora of Bolivia
Flora of Cuba
Flora of Florida
Flora of Guyana
Flora of Honduras
Flora of Paraguay
Flora of Peru
Flora of Puerto Rico
Flora of Suriname
Flora of Uruguay
Flora of Venezuela
Taxa named by A. S. Hitchcock